Gould was a railway station on the Walhalla narrow gauge line in Gippsland, Victoria, Australia. The station was opened in 1910 and consisted of a station platform and a goods siding.

References

Disused railway stations in Victoria (Australia)
Transport in Gippsland (region)
Shire of Baw Baw
Walhalla railway line